The women's 100 metre butterfly S10 event at the 2016 Paralympic Games took place on 12 September 2016, at the Olympic Aquatics Stadium. Two heats were held. The swimmers with the eight fastest times advanced to the final.

Heats

Heat 1 
10:51 12 September 2016:

Heat 2 
10:55 12 September 2016:

Final 
18:43 12 September 2016:

Notes

Swimming at the 2016 Summer Paralympics